The following is a list of awards and nominations received by actress and singer Sissy Spacek. She is a six-time nominee for the Academy Award for Best Actress, winning once for her role in the biographical musical Coal Miner's Daughter (1980). She received two Critics' Choice Movie Awards, three Golden Globe Awards, an Independent Spirit Award, and a Screen Actors Guild Award. Spacek was also nominated for four BAFTA Awards, a Grammy Award, and three Primetime Emmy Awards. In 2011, she received a star on the Hollywood Walk of Fame.

Major awards

Academy Awards

British Academy Film Awards

Golden Globe Awards

Grammy Awards

Primetime Emmy Awards

Screen Actors Guild Awards

Other awards

AARP Movies for Grownups Award

Academy of Country Music Awards

Alliance of Women Film Journalists Awards

American Film Institute

American Television Awards

Avoriaz Fantastic Film Festival

Awards Circuit Community Awards

Black Film Critics Circle Awards

Boston Film Festival

Cable ACE Awards

Central Ohio Film Critics Society Awards

Chicago Film Critics Association Awards

Chlotrudis Society for Independent Film Awards

Country Music Association Awards

Critics' Choice Movie Awards

Dallas–Fort Worth Film Critics Association Awards

David di Donatello Awards

Independent Spirit Awards

Florida Film Critics Circle Awards

Gotham Awards

Hollywood Film Awards

Hollywood Walk of Fame

Houston Film Critics Society Awards

Kansas City Film Critics Circle Awards

Las Vegas Film Critics Society Awards

Locarno International Film Festival

Los Angeles Film Critics Association Awards

National Board Of Review Awards

National Society Of Film Critics Awards

Nevada Film Critics Society Awards

New York Film Critics Circle Awards

Online Film & Television Association Awards

Online Film Critics Society Awards

People's Choice Awards

Satellite Awards

Saturn Awards

Southeastern Film Critics Association Awards

Sundance Film Festival

Vancouver Film Critics Circle Awards

Western Heritage Awards

Women Film Critics Circle Awards

Notes

References

Spacek, Sissy